Bessie Blount may refer to:

Bessie Blount (mistress of Henry VIII) (c. 1500–c. 1540), Henry VIII of England's mistress and mother of his son, Henry Fitzroy
 Bessie Blount (inventor) (1914–2009), American physical therapist, inventor, and forensic scientist